Jean Lansiaux (2 March 1929 – 24 January 2000) was a French boxer. He competed in the men's heavyweight event at the 1952 Summer Olympics.

References

1929 births
2000 deaths
French male boxers
Olympic boxers of France
Boxers at the 1952 Summer Olympics
Place of birth missing
Heavyweight boxers
20th-century French people